Mohammed Alim Razm, an ethnic Uzbek, is a former minister in the Afghan government. Between December 2001 and July 2002 he was Minister of Mines and Industries in the Afghan Interim Authority. Subsequently he was Minister of Light Industries in the Afghan Transitional Administration until October 2004.

References 

Industry ministers of Afghanistan
Mining ministers of Afghanistan